Poseidon was one of the Twelve Olympians in ancient Greek religion and mythology, presiding over the sea, storms, earthquakes and horses. He was the protector of seafarers and the guardian of many Hellenic cities and colonies. In pre-Olympian Bronze Age Greece, Poseidon was venerated as a chief deity at Pylos and Thebes, with the cult title "earth shaker"; in the myths of isolated Arcadia, he is related to Demeter and Persephone and was venerated as a horse, and as a god of the waters. Poseidon maintained both associations among most Greeks: He was regarded as the tamer or father of horses, who, with a strike of his trident, created springs (in the Greek language, the terms for both are related). His Roman equivalent is Neptune.

Homer and Hesiod suggest that Poseidon became lord of the sea when, following the overthrow of his father Cronus, the world was divided by lot among Cronus' three sons; Zeus was given the sky, Hades the underworld, and Poseidon the sea, with the Earth and Mount Olympus belonging to all three. In Homer's Iliad, Poseidon supports the Greeks against the Trojans during the Trojan War; in the Odyssey, during the sea-voyage from Troy back home to Ithaca, the Greek hero Odysseus provokes Poseidon's fury by blinding his son, the Cyclops Polyphemus, resulting in Poseidon punishing him with storms, causing the complete loss of his ship and companions, and delaying his return by ten years. Poseidon is also the subject of a Homeric hymn. In Plato's Timaeus and Critias, the legendary island of Atlantis was Poseidon's domain.

According to legend, Athena became the patron goddess of the city of Athens after a competition with Poseidon, though he remained on the Acropolis in the form of his surrogate, Erechtheus. After the fight, Poseidon sent a monstrous flood to the Attic plain to punish the Athenians for not choosing him.

Etymology 
The form  (Poteidawon) appears in Corinth. A cult title of Poseidon in Linear B is E-ne-si-da-o-ne, "earth-shaker".

The origins of the name "Poseidon" are unclear. Walter Burkert finds that "the second element δᾶ- remains hopelessly ambiguous" and finds a "husband of Earth" reading "quite impossible to prove". According to Robert S. P. Beekes in Etymological Dictionary of Greek, "there is no indication that δᾶ means 'earth'", although the root da appears in the Linear B inscription E-ne-si-da-o-ne, "earth-shaker".

Another, more plausible, theory interprets the second element as related to the (presumed) Doric word *δᾶϝον dâwon, "water", Proto-Indo-European *dah₂- "water" or *dʰenh₂- "to run, flow", Sanskrit दन् dā́-nu- "fluid, drop, dew" and names of rivers such as Danube (< *Danuvius) or Don. This would make *Posei-dawōn into the master of waters. It seems that Poseidon was originally a god of the waters. There is also the possibility that the word has Pre-Greek origin. Plato in his dialogue Cratylus gives two traditional etymologies: either the sea restrained Poseidon when walking as a "foot-bond" (ποσίδεσμον), or he "knew many things" (πολλά εἰδότος or πολλά εἰδῶν).

At least a few sources deem Poseidon as a "prehellenic" (i.e. Pelasgian) word, considering an Indo-European etymology "quite pointless".

Bronze Age Greece

Linear B (Mycenean Greek) inscriptions
If surviving Linear B clay tablets can be trusted, the name po-se-da-wo-ne ("Poseidon") occurs with greater frequency than does di-u-ja ("Zeus"). A feminine variant, po-se-de-ia, is also found, indicating a lost consort goddess, in effect the precursor of Amphitrite. Poseidon carries frequently the title wa-na-ka (wanax), meaning "king" in Linear B inscriptions. The chthonic nature of Poseidon-Wanax is also indicated by his title E-ne-si-da-o-ne in Mycenean Knossos and Pylos, a powerful attribute (earthquakes had accompanied the collapse of the Minoan palace-culture). In the cave of Amnisos (Crete) Enesidaon is related with the cult of Eileithyia, the goddess of childbirth. She was related with the annual birth of the divine child. During the Bronze Age, a goddess of nature, dominated both in Minoan and Mycenean cult, and Wanax (wa-na-ka) was her male companion (paredros) in Mycenean cult. It is possible that Demeter appears as Da-ma-te in a Linear B inscription (PN EN 609), however the interpretation is still under dispute.

In Linear B inscriptions found at Pylos, E-ne-si-da-o-ne is related with Poseidon, and Si-to Po-tini-ja is probably related with Demeter. Tablets from Pylos record sacrificial goods destined for "the Two Queens and Poseidon" ("to the Two Queens and the King": wa-na-soi, wa-na-ka-te). The "Two Queens" may be related with Demeter and Persephone, or their precursors, goddesses who were not associated with Poseidon in later periods.

Arcadian myths 
The illuminating exception is the archaic and localised myth of the stallion Poseidon and mare Demeter at Phigalia in isolated and conservative Arcadia, noted by Pausanias (2nd century AD) as having fallen into desuetude; the stallion Poseidon pursues the mare-Demeter, and from the union she bears the horse Arion, and a daughter (Despoina), who obviously had the shape of a mare too. The violated Demeter was Demeter Erinys (furious). In Arcadia, Demeter's mare-form was worshiped into historical times. Her xoanon of Phigaleia shows how the local cult interpreted her, as goddess of nature. A Medusa type with a horse's head with snaky hair, holding a dove and a dolphin, probably representing her power over air and water.

Origins
It seems that the Arcadian myth is related to the first Greek-speaking people who entered the region during the Bronze Age. (Linear B represents an archaic Greek dialect). Their religious beliefs were mixed with the beliefs of the indigenous population. It is possible that the Greeks did not bring with them other gods except Zeus, Eos, and the Dioskouroi. The horse (numina) was related with the liquid element, and with the underworld. Poseidon appears as a beast (horse), which is the river spirit of the underworld, as it usually happens in northern-European folklore, and not unusually in Greece. Poseidon "Wanax", is the male companion (paredros) of the goddess of nature. In the relative Minoan myth, Pasiphaë is mating with the white bull, and she bears the hybrid creature Minotaur. The Bull was the old pre-Olympian Poseidon. The goddess of nature and her paredros survived in the Eleusinian cult, where the following words were uttered: "Mighty Potnia bore a strong son".

In the heavily sea-dependent Mycenaean culture, there is not sufficient evidence that Poseidon was connected with the sea; it is unclear whether "Posedeia" was a sea-goddess. Homer and Hesiod suggest that Poseidon became lord of the sea following the defeat of his father Cronus, when the world was divided by lot among his three sons; Zeus was given the sky, Hades the underworld, and Poseidon the sea, with the Earth and Mount Olympus belonging to all three. Walter Burkert suggests that the Hellene cult worship of Poseidon as a horse god may be connected to the introduction of the horse and war-chariot from Anatolia to Greece around 1600 BC.

There is evidence that Poseidon was once worshipped as a horse, and this is evident by his cult in Peloponnesos. However, some ancient writers held he was originally a god of the waters, and therefore he became the "earth-shaker", because the Greeks believed that the cause of the earthquakes was the erosion of the rocks by the waters, by the rivers who they saw to disappear into the earth and then to burst out again. This is what the natural philosophers Thales, Anaximenes and Aristotle believed, which may have been similar to the folklore belief.
 
In any case, the early importance of Poseidon can still be glimpsed in Homer's Odyssey, where Poseidon rather than Zeus is the major mover of events. In Homer, Poseidon is the master of the sea.

Worship of Poseidon
Poseidon was a major civic god of several cities: in Athens, he was second only to Athena in importance, while in Corinth and many cities of Magna Graecia he was the chief god of the polis.

In his benign aspect, Poseidon was seen as creating new islands and offering calm seas. When offended or ignored, he supposedly struck the ground with his trident and caused chaotic springs, earthquakes, drownings and shipwrecks. Sailors prayed to Poseidon for a safe voyage, sometimes drowning horses as a sacrifice; in this way, according to a fragmentary papyrus, Alexander the Great paused at the Syrian seashore before the climactic battle of Issus, and resorted to prayers, "invoking Poseidon the sea-god, for whom he ordered a four-horse chariot to be cast into the waves".

According to Pausanias, Poseidon was one of the caretakers of the oracle at Delphi before Olympian Apollo took it over. Apollo and Poseidon worked closely in many realms: in colonization, for example, Delphic Apollo provided the authorization to go out and settle, while Poseidon watched over the colonists on their way, and provided the lustral water for the foundation-sacrifice. Xenophon's Anabasis describes a group of Spartan soldiers in 400–399 BC singing to Poseidon a paean—a kind of hymn normally sung for Apollo. Like Dionysus, who inflamed the maenads, Poseidon also caused certain forms of mental disturbance. A Hippocratic text of ca 400 BC, On the Sacred Disease says that he was blamed for certain types of epilepsy.

Poseidon is still worshipped today in modern Hellenic religion, among other Greek gods. The worship of Greek gods has been recognized by the Greek government since 2017.

Epithets and attributes

Poseidon had a variety of roles, duties and attributes. He is a separate deity from the oldest Greek god of the sea Pontus. In Athens his name is superimposed οn the name of the non-Greek god Erechtheus  (Poseidon Erechtheus). 
In Iliad he is the lord of the sea and his palace is built in Aegai, in the depth of the sea. His significance is indicated by his titles Eurykreion "wide-ruling", an epithet also applied to Agamemnon and Helikonios anax, "lord of Helicon or Helike"  In Helike of Achaia he was specially honoured. Anax is identified in Mycenaean Greek (Linear B) as wa-na-ka,a title of Poseidon as king of the underworld. Aeschylus uses also the epithet anax  and Pindar the epithet Eurymedon "widely ruling".

Some of the epithets (or adjectives) applied to him like Enosigaios, Enosichthon (Homer) and Ennosidas (Pindar), mean "earth shaker". Other epithets that relate him with the earthquakes are Gaieochos  and Seisichthon 
The god who causes the earthquakes is also the protector against them, and he had the epithets Themeliouchos "upholding the foundations", Asphaleios "securer, protector"  with a temple at Tainaron. Pausanias describes a sanctuary of Poseidon near Sparta beside the shrine of Alcon, where he had the surname Domatites, "of the house"
 
Homer uses for Poseidon the title Kyanochaites, "dark-haired, dark blue of the sea". Epithets like Pelagios "of the open sea", Aegeus, "of the high sea"  in the town of Aegae in Euboea, where he had a magnificent temple upon a hill, Pontomedon," lord of the sea" (Pindar, Aeschylus) and Kymothales, "abounding with waves", indicate that Poseidon was regarded as holding sway over the sea. Other epithets that relate him with the sea are, Porthmios, "of strait, narrow sea" at Karpathos, Epactaeus "god worshipped on the coast", in Samos., Alidoupos, "sea resounding". His symbol is the trident and he has the epithet Eutriaina, "with goodly trident" (Pindar). The god of the sea is also the god of fishing, and tuna was his attribute. At Lampsacus they offered fishes to Poseidon and he had the epithet phytalmios  His epithet Phykios, "god of seaweeds" at Mykonos, seems to be related with fishing. He had a fest where women were not allowed, with special offers also to Poseidon Temenites "related to an official domain ". At the same day they made offers to Demeter Chloe therefore Poseidon was the promotor of vegetation. He had the epithet phytalmios at Myconos, Troizen, Megara and Rhodes, comparable with Ptorthios at Chalcis.

Poseidon had a close association with horses. He is known under the epithet  Hippios, "of a horse or horses"  usually in Arcadia. He had temples at Lycosura, Mantineia, Methydrium, Pheneos, Pallandion.
At Lycosura he is related with the cult of Despoina. The modern sanctuary near Mantineia was built by Emperor Hadrian. In Athens on the hill of horses there was the altar of  Poseidon Hippios and Athena Hippia. The temple of Poseidon was destroyed by Antigonus when he attacked Attica. He is usually the tamer of horses (Damaios, at Corinth), and the tender of horses Hippokourios ) at Sparta, where he had a sanctuary near the sanctuary of Artemis Aiginea. In some myths he is the father of horses, either by spilling his seed upon a rock or by mating with a creature who then gave birth to the first horse. In Thessaly he had the title Petraios , "of the rocks". He hit a rock and the first horse "Skyphios" appeared. He was closely related with the springs, and with the strike of his trident, he created springs. He had the epithets Krenouchos, "ruling over springs", and nymphagetes "leader of the nymphs"  On the Acropolis of Athens he created the saltspring Sea of Erechtheus. Many springs like Hippocrene and Aganippe in Helikon are related with the word horse (hippos). (also Glukippe, Hyperippe).
 
Epithets like Genesios  at Lerna Genethlios "of the race or family"  Phratrios "of the brotherhood", and Patrigenios  indicate his relation with the genealogy trees and the brotherhood. Other epithets of Poseidon in local cults are Epoptes, "overseer, watcher" at Megalopolis, Empylios, "at the gate " at Thebes., Kronios (Pindar) and semnos, "august, holy"  (Sophocles).

The cult of Poseidon is often related with festivals. At Corinth the Isthmian games was an athletic and music festival to honour the god who had the epithet Isthmios. The Amphictiony of Kalaureia belonged to him. At Tainaron he had a famous temple and festival. Other games which belonged to him are the Pohoidaia in Helos and Thuria and the race in Gaiaochō  Poseidon Gaieochos had a temple near Sparta beside a Hippodrome. Τhe epithet probably means " the one who moves under the earth" ' and therefore shakes the earth. This seem to relate Poseidon with the rivers at Peloponnesus that seem to disappear and then flow under the earth. At Ephesus there was a fest "Tavria" and he had the epithet Tavreios, "related with the bull".

Mythology

Birth 

In the standard version, Poseidon was born to the Titans Cronus and Rhea, the fifth child out of six, born after Hestia, Demeter, Hera and Hades in that order. Because Poseidon's father was afraid that one of his children would overthrow him like he had done to his own father, Cronus devoured each infant as soon as they were born. Poseidon was the last one to suffer this fate before Rhea decided to deceive Cronus and whisk the sixth child, Zeus, away to safety, after offering Cronus a rock wrapped in a blanket to eat. Once Zeus was grown, he gave his father a powerful emetic that made him gorge up the children he had eaten. The five children emerged from their father's belly in reverse order, making Poseidon both the second youngest child and the second oldest at the same time. Armed with a trident forged for him by the Cyclopes, Poseidon with his siblings and other divine allies defeated the Titans and became rulers in their place. According to Homer and Apollodorus, Zeus, Poseidon and the third brother Hades then divided the world between them by drawing lots; Zeus got the sky, Poseidon the sea, and Hades the Underworld.

In a rarer - and later- version, Poseidon avoided being devoured by his father as his mother Rhea saved him in the same manner she did Zeus, by offering Cronus a foal instead, claiming she had given birth to a horse instead of a god, while she had actually laid the child in a flock. Rhea intrusted her infant to a spring nymph. When Cronus demanded the child, the nymph Arne denied having him, and her spring thereafter was called Arne (which bears resemblance to the Greek word for 'deny'). In another tale, Rhea gave Poseidon to the Telchines, ancient inhabitants of the island of Rhodes; Capheira, an Oceanid nymph, became the young god's nurse. As Poseidon grew, he fell in love with Halia, the beautiful sister of the Telchines, and fathered six sons and one daughter, Rhodos, on her. By that time Aphrodite, the goddess of love, had been born and risen from the sea, and attempted to make a stop at Rhodes on her way to Cyprus. Poseidon and Halia's sons denied her hospitality, so Aphrodite cursed them to fall in love and rape Halia. After they had done so, Poseidon made them sink below the sea.

In Homer's Odyssey, Poseidon has a home in Aegae.

City patronage

Foundation of Athens 

Athena became the patron goddess of the city of Athens after a competition with Poseidon. Yet Poseidon remained a numinous presence on the Acropolis in the form of his surrogate, Erechtheus. At the dissolution festival at the end of the year in the Athenian calendar, the Skira, the priests of Athena and the priest of Poseidon would process under canopies to Eleusis. They agreed that each would give the Athenians one gift and the Athenians would choose whichever gift they preferred. Poseidon struck the ground with his trident and a spring sprang up; the water was salty and not very useful, whereas Athena offered them an olive tree.

The Athenians or their king, Cecrops, accepted the olive tree and along with it Athena as their patron, for the olive tree brought wood, oil and food. After the fight, infuriated at his loss, Poseidon sent a monstrous flood to the Attic Plain, to punish the Athenians for not choosing him. The depression made by Poseidon's trident and filled with salt water was surrounded by the northern hall of the Erechtheum, remaining open to the air. "In cult, Poseidon was identified with Erechtheus", Walter Burkert noted; "the myth turns this into a temporal-causal sequence: in his anger at losing, Poseidon led his son Eumolpus against Athens and killed Erectheus."

It was also said that Poseidon in his anger over his defeat sent one of his sons, Halirrhothius, to cut down Athena's tree gift. But as Halirrhothius swung his axe, he missed his aim and it fell in himself, killing him instantly. Poseidon in fury accused Ares of murder, and the matter was eventually settled on the Areopagus ("hill of Ares") in favour of Ares, which was thereafter named after the event. In other versions, Halirrhothius raped Alcippe, Ares's daughter, so Ares slew him. Poseidon was enraged over the murder of his son, and Ares was thus held in hold, which eventually acquitted him.

The contest of Athena and Poseidon was the subject of the reliefs on the western pediment of the Parthenon, the first sight that greeted the arriving visitor.

This myth is construed by Robert Graves and others as reflecting a clash between the inhabitants during Mycenaean times and newer immigrants. Athens at its height was a significant sea power, at one point defeating the Persian fleet at Salamis Island in a sea battle.

Others 
The Corinthians had a similar story to the foundations of Athens, about their own city Corinth. According to the myth, Helios and Poseidon clashed, both desiring to make the city their own. Their dispute was brought to one of the Hecatoncheires, Briareos, an elder god, who was thus tasked to settle the fight between the two gods. Briareus decided to award the Acrocorinth to Helios, while to Poseidon he gave the isthmus of Corinth. In this tale, Helios and Poseidon are supposed to represent fire versus water. Helios, as the sun god, received the area that is closest to the sky, while Poseidon, who is the sea god, got the isthmus by the sea.

At another time, Poseidon came to an agreement with another goddess, Leto, that he would give her the island of Delos in exchange for the island of Calauria; he also exchanged Delphi for Taenarum with Apollo. A temple of Poseidon stood at Calauria during ancient times.

Poseidon also came to dispute with his sister Hera over the city of Argos. A local king was chosen to settle the matter, Phoroneus, and he decided to award the city to Hera, who then became its patroness. Poseidon was enraged, and sent a drought to plague the city. One day, as an Argive woman named Amymone went out in search of water, came upon a satyr who tried to rape her. Amymone prayed to Poseidon for help, and he scared the satyr away with his trident. After Poseidon rescued Amymone from the lecherous satyr he fathered a child on her, Nauplius.

Walls of Troy 
Poseidon and Apollo, having offended Zeus by their rebellion in Hera's scheme, were temporarily stripped of their divine authority and sent to serve King Laomedon of Troy. He had them build huge walls around the city and promised to reward them with his immortal horses, a promise he then refused to fulfill. In vengeance, before the Trojan War, Poseidon sent a sea monster to attack Troy. The monster was later killed by Heracles.

Theseus 
Poseidon laid with a Troezenian princess named Aethra, and had on her Theseus. Theseus was also said to be the son of Aegeus, the king of Athens, who slept with Aethra on the very same night. Thus Theseus's origins included both the human and the divine element.

Meanwhile in Crete, Zeus's son Minos asked for Poseidon's help in order to certify his claim on the throne of Crete. Poseidon offered Minos a splendid white bull, with the understanding that he was to sacrifice the bull to Poseidon later. The Cretans were so impressed with the bull and the divine sign itself that Minos was declared king of Crete. But wishing to keep the beautiful animal for himself, Minos instead sacrificed an ordinary bull to the sea-god instead of the agreed upon one. Poseidon, enraged, caused Minos's wife, Pasiphae, to fall in love with the bull; their coupling produced the Minotaur, a half-bull half-human creature who fed on human flesh. Minos would conceal him within the labyrinth built by Daedalus, and feed to it Athenian men and women he forced Aegeus to sent him over.

Once Theseus was grown up and recognized by his father Aegeus in Athens, he decided to end the bloody tax Athens had to pay to Crete once and for all, and volunteered to set sail to Crete along with the other Athenian youths who had been chosen to be devoured by the Minotaur. Once he arrived in Crete, Minos insulted Theseus and insisted he was no son of Poseidon; to demonstrate so, he threw his own ring in to the sea, and commanded Theseus to retrieve it, if he truly was the sea-god's son. Theseus immediately dove in after it. Dolphins then came as guides and escorted him to the halls of Poseidon and Amphitrite's palace, where he was warmly welcomed. He received the ring, and in addition a purple wedding cloak and a crown from Amphitrite, to prove his words. Theseus then emerged from the sea and gave the ring to Minos.

Theseus killed the Minotaur, and in time he would succeed his father Aegeus as king of Athens. By an Amazon he had a son, Hippolytus, while his wife Phaedra (Minos' daughter) gave him two sons. At some point, Poseidon promised three favours to Theseus, and he called upon Poseidon to fulfill one of those when Phaedra falsely accused Hippolytus of forcing himself on her. Theseus, not knowing the truth, asked his father to destroy Hippolytus; Poseidon granted his son's wish, and as Hippolytus was driving by the sea, Poseidon sent a terrifying sea monster to spook the man's horses, which then dragged him to his death.

Consort, lovers, victims and children 
Poseidon was said to have had many lovers of both sexes (see expandable list below). His consort was Amphitrite, a nymph and ancient sea-goddess, daughter of Nereus and Doris. In one account, attributed to Eratosthenes, Poseidon wished to wed Amphitrite, but she fled from him and hid with Atlas. Poseidon sent out many to find her, and it was a dolphin who tracked her down. The dolphin persuaded Amphitrite to accept Poseidon as her husband, and eventually took charge of their wedding. Poseidon then put him among the stars as a reward for his good services. Oppian says that the dolphin betrayed Amphitrite's whereabouts to Poseidon, and he carried off Amphitrite against her will to marry her. Together they had a son named Triton, a merman. 

Poseidon was the father of many heroes. He is thought to have fathered the famed Theseus. Poseidon also had an affair with Alope, his granddaughter through Cercyon, his son and King of Eleusis, begetting the Attic hero Hippothoon. Cercyon had his daughter buried alive but Poseidon turned her into the spring, Alope, near Eleusis.

A mortal woman named Cleito once lived on an isolated island; Poseidon fell in love with the human mortal and created a dwelling sanctuary at the top of a hill near the middle of the island and surrounded the dwelling with rings of water and land to protect her. She gave birth to five sets of twin boys; the firstborn, Atlas, became the first ruler of Atlantis.

Not all of Poseidon's children were human. His other children include Polyphemus (the Cyclops) and, finally, Alebion and Bergion and Otos and Ephialtae (the giants).

The philosopher Plato was held by his fellow ancient Greeks to have traced his descent to the sea-God Poseidon through his father Ariston and his mythic predecessors the demigod kings Codrus and Melanthus.

Poseidon also took the young Nerites, the son of Nereus and Doris (and thus brother to Amphitrite) as a lover. Nerites was also Poseidon's charioteer, and impressed all marine creatures with his speed. But one day the sun god, Helios, turned Nerites into a shellfish. Aelian, who recorded this tale as told by mariners, says it is not clear why Helios did this, but theorizes he might have been offended somehow, or that he and Poseidon were rivals in love, and Helios wanted Nerites to travel among the constellations instead of the sea-monsters. From the love between Poseidon and Nerites was born Anteros, mutual love.

Other male lovers included Pelops and Patroclus.

Rape and assault victims 
A mortal woman named Tyro was married to Cretheus (with whom she had one son, Aeson), but loved Enipeus, a river god. She pursued Enipeus, who refused her advances. One day, Poseidon, filled with lust for Tyro, disguised himself as Enipeus, and from their union were born the heroes Pelias and Neleus, twin boys.

In an archaic myth, Poseidon once pursued Demeter. She spurned his advances, turning herself into a mare so that she could hide in a herd of horses; he saw through the deception and became a stallion, captured and raped her. Their child was a horse, Arion, which was capable of human speech. According to Hesiod's Theogony, Poseidon "lay down in a soft meadow among spring flowers" with the Gorgon Medusa and two offspring, the winged horse Pegasus and the warrior Chrysaor, were born when the hero Perseus cut off Medusa's head. Ovid however says that Medusa was originally a very beautiful maiden whom Poseidon raped inside the temple of Athena. Athena, furious over the sacrilege, changed the beautiful girl into a monster. Elsewhere in the Metamorphoses, Ovid says that Poseidon seduced Medusa in the form of a bird.

One day, Poseidon spotted Caenis walking by the seashore, caught her and raped her. Having enjoyed her greatly, he offered her a wish, any wish. Traumatized, Caenis wished to be transformed into a man, so that she would never experience assault again. Poseidon fulfilled her request and changed her into a male warrior, who then took the name Caeneus. Another time Poseidon once fell in love with a Phocian woman, Corone, the daughter of Coronaeus as she was walking along the shore. He attempted to court her, but she rejected him, and ran away. Poseidon then chased her down with the aim to rape her. Athena, witnessing all that, took pity in the girl and changed her into a crow.

When Zeus fell in love and pursued the goddess Asteria, she transformed into a quail and flung herself into the sea to escape being raped by him. Poseidon then, equally rapacious, picked up the chase where Zeus had left it and chased Asteria with the aim to force himself on her, so Asteria had to transform for a second time to save herself, this time into a small rocky island named Delos.

<div style=display:inline-table>
{| class="wikitable sortable"
|+Offspring and mothers, Table 1
! scope="col" style="width: 230pt;" | Offspring
! scope="col" style="width: 130pt;" | Mother
|-
|Triton, Benthesicyme, Rhodos
|Amphitrite
|-
|Antaeus, Charybdis, Laistryon
|Gaea
|-
|Despoina, Arion
|Demeter
|-
|Rhodos, Herophile 
|Aphrodite
|-
|Pegasus, Chrysaor
|Medusa
|-
|Ergiscus
|Aba
|-
|Aethusa, Hyrieus, Hyperenor, Hyperes. Anthas
|Alcyone
|-
|Abas
|Arethusa
|-
|Halirrhothius
|Bathycleia or Euryte
|-
|Chrysomallus
|Bisalpis or Bisaltis or Theophane
|-
|Minyas
|Callirhoe
|-
|Lycus, Nycteus, Eurypylus (Eurytus), Lycaon
|Celaeno
|-
|Asopus (possibly)
|Kelousa or Pero
|-
|Parnassus
|Cleodora
|-
|Eumolpus
|Chione
|-
|Phaeax
|Corcyra
|-
|Rhode (possibly), six sons
|Halia
|-
|Eirene
|Melantheia
|-
|Amycus, Mygdon
|Melia
|-
|Aspledon
|Mideia
|-
|Astacus
|Olbia
|-
|Cenchrias, Leches
|Peirene
|-
|Euadne
|Pitane or Lena
|-
|Phocus
|Pronoe
|-
|Athos
|Rhodope
|-
|Cychreus
|Salamis
|-
|Taras
|Satyria of Taras
|-
|Polyphemus
|Thoosa
|-
|Chios
|a nymph of Chios
|-
|Melas, Agelus, Malina
|another nymph of Chios|-
|Dictys, Actor
|Agamede
|-
|Theseus
|Aethra
|-
|Ogyges
|Alistra
|-
|Hippothoon
|Alope
|-
|Erythras
|Amphimedusa
|-
|Nauplius
|Amymone
|-
|Busiris
|Anippe or Lysianassa
|-
|Idas
|Arene
|-
|Aeolus
|Antiope or Arne or Melanippe
|-
|Boeotus
|Melanippe
|-
|Oeoclus
|Ascre
|-
|Ancaeus, Eurypylus
|Astypalaea
|-
|Peratus
|Calchinia
|-
|Cycnus
|Calyce or Harpale or Scamandrodice or a Nereid
|}
</div>

Genealogy

 In literature and art 

In Greek art, Poseidon rides a chariot that was pulled by a hippocampus or by horses that could ride on the sea. He was associated with dolphins and three-pronged fish spears (tridents). He lived in a palace on the ocean floor, made of coral and gems.

In the Iliad, Poseidon favors the Greeks, and on several occasion takes an active part in the battle against the Trojan forces. However, in Book XX he rescues Aeneas after the Trojan prince is laid low by Achilles.

In the Odyssey, Poseidon is notable for his hatred of Odysseus who blinded the god's son, the Cyclops Polyphemus. The enmity of Poseidon prevents Odysseus's return home to Ithaca for many years. Odysseus is even told, notwithstanding his ultimate safe return, that to placate the wrath of Poseidon will require one more voyage on his part.

In the Aeneid, Neptune is still resentful of the wandering Trojans, but is not as vindictive as Juno, and in Book I he rescues the Trojan fleet from the goddess's attempts to wreck it, although his primary motivation for doing this is his annoyance at Juno's having intruded into his domain.

A hymn to Poseidon included among the Homeric Hymns is a brief invocation, a seven-line introduction that addresses the god as both "mover of the earth and barren sea, god of the deep who is also lord of Mount Helicon and wide Aegae, and specifies his twofold nature as an Olympian: "a tamer of horses and a saviour of ships".

In modern culture

Due to his status as a Greek god, Poseidon has made multiple appearances in modern and popular culture.

 Books 
Poseidon has appeared in modern literature, most notably in the Percy Jackson & the Olympians series, in which he plays a role as the titular character's father. Poseidon appears in Gareth Hinds' 2010 version of The Odyssey.

 Webcomics 
Poseidon appeared in Rachel Smythe's 2018 comic Lore Olympus.

Films and television
Poseidon has been very popular especially in god-related films. John Putch directed the 2005 film The Poseidon Adventure. Wolfgang Petersen also film adapted Paul Gallico's novel and directed the 2006 film Poseidon.

Poseidon appears in Percy Jackson & the Olympians: The Lightning Thief and Percy Jackson: Sea of Monsters, the two film adaptations of the book series. He also appears in the ABC television series Once Upon a Time as a supporting character in the second half of season four, played by Ernie Hudson. In this version, Poseidon is portrayed as the father of the Sea Witch Ursula.

 Video games 
Poseidon has made multiple appearances in video games, such as in God of War 3 by Sony. In the game, Poseidon appears as a boss for the player to defeat. He also appears in Smite as a playable character. In the video game Hades, he is a character who will grant "boons".
Narrations

 Poseidon myths as told by story tellers
Bibliography of reconstruction: 
Homer, Odyssey, 11.567 (7th century BC)
Pindar, Olympian Odes, 1 (476 BC)
Euripides, Orestes, 12–16 (408 BC)Bibliotheca Epitome 2: 1–9 (140 BC)
Ovid, Metamorphoses, VI: 213, 458 (AD 8); 
Hyginus, Fables, 82: Tantalus; 83: Pelops (1st century AD)
Pausanias, Description of Greece, 2.22.3 (AD 160 – 176)

Bibliography of reconstruction: 
Pindar, Olympian Ode, I (476 BC)
Sophocles, (1) Electra, 504 (430 – 415 BC) & (2) Oenomaus, Fr. 433 (408 BC)
Euripides, Orestes, 1024–1062 (408 BC)Bibliotheca Epitome 2, 1–9 (140 BC)
Diodorus Siculus, Histories, 4.73 (1st century BC)
Hyginus, Fables, 84: Oinomaus; Poetic Astronomy, ii (1st century AD)
Pausanias, Description of Greece, 5.1.3 – 7; 5.13.1; 6.21.9; 8.14.10 – 11 (c. AD 160 – 176)
Philostratus the Elder Imagines, I.30: Pelops (AD 170 – 245)
 Philostratus the Younger, Imagines, 9: Pelops (c. 200 – 245)
First Vatican Mythographer, 22: Myrtilus; Atreus et Thyestes
Second Vatican Mythographer, 146: Oenomaus

 Gallery 

 Paintings 

 Statues 

See also

Family tree of the Greek gods
Ionian League
Panionium – Ionian festival to Poseidon
Trident of Poseidon

 Notes 

 References 

 Apollodorus, Apollodorus, The Library, with an English Translation by Sir James George Frazer, F.B.A., F.R.S. in 2 Volumes. Cambridge, Massachusetts, Harvard University Press; London, William Heinemann Ltd. 1921. . Online version at the Perseus Digital Library.
 Apollonius of Rhodes, Apollonius Rhodius: the Argonautica, translated by Robert Cooper Seaton, W. Heinemann, 1912. Internet Archive.
 Burkert, Walter (1983), Homo Necans, University of California Press, Berkeley and Los Angeles. 1983. .
 Burkert, Walter (1985), Greek Religion, Wiley-Blackwell 1985. . Internet Archive.
 Dietrich, B. C., The Origins of Greek Religion, Bristol Phoenix Press, 2004. .
 Diodorus Siculus, Library of History, Volume III: Books 4.59-8, translated by C. H. Oldfather, Loeb Classical Library No. 340. Cambridge, Massachusetts, Harvard University Press, 1939. . Online version at Harvard University Press. Online version by Bill Thayer.
 Dionysius of Halicarnassus. Roman Antiquities, Volume I: Books 1–2, translated by Earnest Cary. Loeb Classical Library No. 319. Cambridge, Massachusetts, Harvard University Press, 1937. Online version by Bill Thayer. Online version at Harvard University Press.
 Gantz, Timothy, Early Greek Myth: A Guide to Literary and Artistic Sources, Johns Hopkins University Press, 1996, Two volumes:  (Vol. 1),  (Vol. 2).
 
 Halieutica in Oppian, Colluthus, Tryphiodorus. Oppian, Colluthus, and Tryphiodorus. Translated by A. W. Mair, edited by W. H. D. Rouse. Loeb Classical Library 219. Cambridge, MA: Harvard University Press, 1928.
 
 Hesiod, Theogony, in The Homeric Hymns and Homerica with an English Translation by Hugh G. Evelyn-White, Cambridge, Massachusetts., Harvard University Press; London, William Heinemann Ltd. 1914. Online version at the Perseus Digital Library.
 Homer, The Iliad with an English Translation by A.T. Murray, PhD in two volumes. Cambridge, Massachusetts., Harvard University Press; London, William Heinemann, Ltd. 1924. Online version at the Perseus Digital Library.
 Homer; The Odyssey with an English Translation by A.T. Murray, PH.D. in two volumes. Cambridge, Massachusetts., Harvard University Press; London, William Heinemann, Ltd. 1919. Online version at the Perseus Digital Library.
 Hyginus, Gaius Julius, De Astronomica, in The Myths of Hyginus, edited and translated by Mary A. Grant, Lawrence: University of Kansas Press, 1960. Online version at ToposText.
 Hyginus, Gaius Julius, Fabulae, in The Myths of Hyginus, edited and translated by Mary A. Grant, Lawrence: University of Kansas Press, 1960. Online version at ToposText.
 Janda, Michael, Eleusis. Das indogermanische Erbe der Mysterien, Innsbruck 2000, pp. 256–258 (Innsbrucker Beiträge zur Sprachwissenschaft, vol. 96)
 
 
 Most, G.W., Hesiod, Theogony, Works and Days, Testimonia, Edited and translated by Glenn W. Most, Loeb Classical Library No. 57, Cambridge, Massachusetts, Harvard University Press, 2018. . Online version at Harvard University Press.
 
 
 Ovid, Heroides in Heroides. Amores. Translated by Grant Showerman. Revised by G. P. Goold. Loeb Classical Library No. 41. Cambridge, Massachusetts: Harvard University Press, 1977. . Online version at Harvard University Press.
 Ovid, Metamorphoses, Brookes More, Boston, Cornhill Publishing Co. 1922. Online version at the Perseus Digital Library.
 Pausanias, Pausanias Description of Greece with an English Translation by W.H.S. Jones, Litt.D., and H.A. Ormerod, M.A., in 4 Volumes. Cambridge, Massachusetts, Harvard University Press; London, William Heinemann Ltd. 1918. Online version at the Perseus Digital Library.
 Plato,  Cratylus in Plato in Twelve Volumes, Vol. 12 translated by Harold N. Fowler, Cambridge, Massachusetts, Harvard University Press; London, William Heinemann Ltd. 1925. Online version at the Perseus Digital Library.
 Plato, Critias in Plato in Twelve Volumes, Vol. 9 translated by W.R.M. Lamb, Cambridge, Massachusetts, Harvard University Press; London, William Heinemann Ltd. 1925. Online version at the Perseus Digital Library.
 
 
 Smith, William, Dictionary of Greek and Roman Biography and Mythology, London (1873). Online version at the Perseus Digital Library.
 Strabo, Geography, Editors, H.C. Hamilton, Esq., W. Falconer, M.A., London. George Bell & Sons. 1903. Online version at the Perseus Digital Library.
 Tzetzes, John, Scolia eis Lycophroon, edited by Christian Gottfried Müller, Sumtibus F.C.G. Vogelii, 1811. Internet Archive.
 Virgil, Aeneid, Theodore C. Williams. trans. Boston. Houghton Mifflin Co. 1910. Online version at the Perseus Digital Library.
 
 
 

External links

Theoi.com: Poseidon
GML Poseidon
Gods found in Mycenaean Greece; a table drawn up from Michael Ventris and John Chadwick, Documents in Mycenaean Greek'' second edition (Cambridge 1973)

 
Animal gods
Children of Cronus
Drought gods
Earth gods
Extramarital relationships
Nature gods
Sea and river gods
Water gods
Sky and weather gods
Deities in the Iliad
Mythological rapists
Twelve Olympians
LGBT themes in Greek mythology
Homosexuality and bisexuality deities
Greek sea gods
Family of Plato
Characters in the Odyssey
Metamorphoses characters
Kings in Greek mythology
Consorts of Aphrodite
Consorts of Demeter
Consorts of Gaia
Horse deities
Shapeshifters in Greek mythology